Allan Pollok-Morris MSC FRSA is a documentary photographer, bookbinder and publisher.

Background
Allan Robert Pollok-Morris (1972), born Rottenrow Maternity Hospital Glasgow, grew up first in Manchester and then Helensburgh on the River Clyde. Schooled Lomond School and Strathallan School.  Studied at The Robert Gordon University Aberdeen, Strathclyde University Glasgow and Central Saint Martins School of Art London. More recently, he has been an associate lecturer in photography at Central Saint Martins with the University of the Arts London.

Works
A features photographer of property, estates, environmental art, landscape and garden design, his work has been commissioned in many titles internationally including Vogue, Architectural Digest, Elle Decor, *Wallpaper, Marie-Clare, GQ, Esquire, The Financial Times, The Telegraph, The guardian, The Times, The New York Times, Wall Street Journal, Country Life, House & Garden, BBC Gardens Illustrated, The Garden (journal) and the Garden Design Journal.

Since 2011 Pollok-Morris has been regularly commissioned by Anna Wintour for Vogue USA property features.  

However, most of Pollok-Morris's work is privately commissioned and not publicly published.  In 2007 Pollok-Morris founded Northfield Editions, a fine-art print house and book bindery, producing privately commissioned, handmade, archival, photographic print and book editions documenting estates and property for high net worth families internationally.

Northfield Editions has occasionally produced acclaimed retail book editions and public exhibitions, principally of Pollok-Morris's work, but also other photographers including the 2016 national exhibition 'Lenses on Landscape Genius' celebrating the 300th anniversary of Capability Brown's work.

Pollok-Morris has been active in the development of the highest quality photographic, print and bookbinding technologies in the world.  Notable accomplishments include the innovation of a unique large-scale, archival, photographic book paper, print processes and hand binding techniques to produce unique handmade photographic book editions acclaimed as the best in the world.

Since 2007 Pollok-Morris has consistently made industry leading developments in the highest quality, largest format, highest definition digital cameras for ground and air based photography. Since 2015 Pollok-Morris has led cross-industry collaborations to create unique drone technologies with the most recent landmark achievement when Pollok-Morris launched the world's first and only 150+ Megapixel photography drone.

Pollok-Morris has long championed the work of landscape and garden designers working closely with many leaders in the field including Tom Stuart-Smith, Jinny Blom, Dan Pearson, Piet Oudolf, James Alexander-Sinclair, Luciano Giubbilei, Andy Sturgeon, Xa Tollemache and Arabella Lennox Boyd.

Pollok-Morris has undertaken many commissions to photograph sculpture, land art and landscape design with numerous press, books and exhibitions of his photography of the work of artists including Andy Goldsworthy, Anish Kapoor, Anthony Gormley, Charles Jencks, Ian Hamilton Finlay, Joana Vasconcelos, James Turrell, Phylida Barlow, Pablo Bronstein, Nicholas Party, Christian Boltanski, Alec Finlay, Sara Barker, Nathan Coley, Tania Kovats, Anya Gallaccio, Jim Lambie, Cornelia Parker, Peter Liversidge, Laura Ford, Marc Quinn, Helen Chadwick, Rachel Maclean and Tracey Emin.

Exhibitions 
Exhibitions include:

 Exhibition of his work at the Royal Botanic Garden Edinburgh from September 2008 to January 2009.
 February/March 2009 at the Bonhoga Gallery in Lerwick, Shetland.
 Exhibition of his work curated by the Chicago Botanic Garden in 2010.
 In 2011 Smithsonian exhibition of his work at the United States Botanic Garden in Washington, D.C.
 From October 2013 to March 2014 Exhibition of his work curated by New York Botanical Garden.
 As well as numerous exhibitions throughout London including 2016 'Lenses On Landscape Genius' Somerset House London.

Honours and awards
Elected a Fellow of the Royal Society of Arts (FRSA).

Publications
  
  
https://www.jupiterartland.org/shop/the-generous-landscape-ten-years-of-jupiter-artland

References

External links
https://www.facebook.com/Northfield-Editions-117213154964348/?ref=aymt_homepage_panel&eid=ARAkYlnlc-qIXPPQTrR3o5gyFdlPf780BMAlA9nMxfEcaepdXx3nF5ZzzUUyJdqZl7v2dncWUT96hkdl
https://reckless-gardener.co.uk/an-experience-of-place/
https://www.youtube.com/watch?v=X7eYSNsUVsY
https://www.washingtonpost.com/local/allan-pollok-morris-close-encounters/2011/02/23/ABVncZQ_story.html
http://into-gardens.com/contributor/allan-pollok-morris/ Allan Pollok-Morris at www.into-gardens.com
http://www.northfieldeditions.com/ Northfield Editions
http://www.allanpollokmorris.com/ Allan Pollok-Morris official website
http://www.gardenmediaguild.co.uk/guild-members/directory/profile/Allan-Pollok-Morris/271 Allan Pollok-Morris at the Garden Media Guild
http://www.professionalgardenphotographers.com/portfolios/allan-pollok-morris Allan Pollok-Morris at the Professional Garden Photographers' Association
https://reckless-gardener.co.uk/tag/allan-pollok-morris/
https://www.nybg.org/blogs/plant-talk/tag/allan-pollok-morris/
https://www.outdoorphotographymagazine.co.uk/latest/articles/2018/11/the-generous-landscape-ten-years-of-jupiter-artland-with-allan-pollok-morris/
https://dirt.asla.org/2011/03/02/allan-pollok-morris-gets-close/

Living people
People educated at Lomond School
People educated at Strathallan School
Alumni of Central Saint Martins
Academics of Central Saint Martins
Documentary photographers
Landscape photographers
Scottish photographers
Year of birth missing (living people)